Zemst is a municipality located in the Belgian province of Flemish Brabant. The municipality comprises the villages of Elewijt, Eppegem, Hofstade, Weerde, Zemst-Laar, Zemst-Bos and Zemst proper. On January 1, 2006, Zemst had a total population of 21,327. The total area is 42.83 km2 which gives a population density of 498 inhabitants per km2.

References

External links 
 
 Official website – Available only in Dutch

Municipalities of Flemish Brabant
Nervii